150th meridian may refer to:

150th  meridian east, a line of longitude east of the Greenwich Meridian
150th meridian west, a line of longitude west of the Greenwich Meridian